Sir Patrick William Eisdell Moore  (17 March 1918 – 18 June 2015) was a New Zealand surgeon and medical researcher. He was a pioneer in cochlear implants, and was the first person in the world to perform an eardrum transplant. He also served as a medical officer in World War II, and was the only Pākehā in the 28th Māori Battalion. His autobiography So Old So Quick was released in 2004.

Moore was born in Bristol, England on 17 March 1918, the son of Alice Moore (née Lofthouse) and her husband, New Zealand surgeon Arthur Eisdell Moore. He was educated at Auckland Grammar School, and then studied medicine at the University of Otago, from where he graduated MB ChB in 1943. On 21 December 1942, he married Beth Beedie in Dannevirke.

In the 1982 New Year Honours, Moore was appointed an Officer of the Order of the British Empire, for services to otolaryngology and the community, and he was made a Knight Bachelor, for services to otolaryngology, in the 1992 New Year Honours.

Moore died in Auckland on 18 June 2015. His wife, Beth, Lady Moore, died on 7 August 2017.

References

1918 births
2015 deaths
People educated at Auckland Grammar School
University of Otago alumni
New Zealand otolaryngologists
New Zealand Army officers
New Zealand military personnel of World War II
New Zealand Knights Bachelor
New Zealand Officers of the Order of the British Empire
British emigrants to New Zealand